This is a list of years in Kosovo. For only articles about years in Kosovo that have been written, see :Category:Years in Kosovo.

20th century (Pre-Declared Independence) 
Decades: 1900s ·
1910s ·
1920s ·
1930s ·
1940s ·
1950s ·
1960s ·
1970s ·
1980s ·
1990s

21st century (Declared Independence) 
Decades: 2000s ·
2010s ·
2020s

2000s: 2008 · 2009

 
Kosovo